Sealston is an unincorporated community in King George County, Virginia, United States.

Lamb's Creek Church was listed on the National Register of Historic Places in 1972.

References

United States Postal Service
Sealston Post Office
1130 Kings Highway
Sealston,Virginia 22547

Phone(540)775-3158

Unincorporated communities in Virginia
Unincorporated communities in King George County, Virginia